Events from 2020 in Tuvalu.

Incumbents 
 Monarch: Elizabeth II
 Governor-General: Iakoba Italeli
 Prime Minister: Kausea Natano

Events 
Ongoing – COVID-19 pandemic in Oceania

 26 March – Governor-General Iakoba Italeli declared a state of emergency in response to the growing threat of COVID-19.

 3 April – Despite there being no cases in the country, visitors were banned from landing in the country without first undergoing 14 days of isolation in a third party state.

Deaths

References 

 
Tuvalu
Tuvalu